Alexander Meyer (born 19 October 1983 in Jülich, West Germany) is a former German footballer.

References

External links 
 

1983 births
Living people
German footballers
Bayer 04 Leverkusen players
Bayer 04 Leverkusen II players
MSV Duisburg players
Bundesliga players
2. Bundesliga players
Germany B international footballers
Germany youth international footballers
Association football defenders
People from Jülich
Sportspeople from Cologne (region)
Footballers from North Rhine-Westphalia